Dyck is a form of the Dutch surname (van) Dijck, which is also common among Russian Mennonites.

Notable surnames

 Aganetha Dyck (born 1937), Canadian artist
 Anthony van Dyck (1599–1641), Flemish artist
 Cornelius Van Allen Van Dyck (1818–1895), American missionary
 Howard Dyck (born 1942), Canadian conductor
 Lillian Dyck (born 1945), Canadian senator
 Lionel Dyck (born 1944), Rhodesian-born mercenary
 Paul Dyck (born 1971), Canadian ice hockey player
 Peter George Dyck (1946–2020), Canadian politician
 Rand Dyck (born 1943), Canadian professor
 Walther von Dyck (1856–1934), German mathematician

Fictional Dycks
 Elsie Dyck, fictional Mennonite writer in Andrew Unger's novel Once Removed
 Harry Dyck, recurring character in The Daily Bonnet
 Noah and Anita Dyck, fictional Mennonite couple in the television show Letterkenny
 A common misspelling of the movie Dick since the movie's box art title and logo on the trailer have the hands of a person pointed out to shape like a "Y".

See also
 Dick (surname)
 Dyck language
 Dyke (disambiguation) or Dike, Van Dyke (disambiguation)
 Dueck or Dück (surname)

Russian Mennonite surnames